Pseudodipsas is a genus of butterflies in the family Lycaenidae with six species, two of which are unnamed. They are found in areas of Australia and New Guinea.

Species
Pseudodipsas eone (C. & R. Felder, 1860)
Pseudodipsas cephenes Hewitson, 1874 - Cephenes blue
Pseudodipsas aurea Sands, 1976
Pseudodipsas una (D’Abrera, 1971)

References

Luciini
Lycaenidae genera
Taxa named by Baron Cajetan von Felder
Taxa named by Rudolf Felder